Charles Bukeko (10 July 1962 – 18 July 2020) was a Kenyan actor and comedian.  He was known for portraying the titular character in the television series Papa Shirandula, which he also created and won the 2010 Kalasha Award for Best Actor in a TV Series.  Bukeko also appeared in the 2012 film The Captain of Nakara. Bukeko died on July 18, 2020, from what seemed like COVID-19 symptoms.

Early life and education
Bukeko was the firstborn of four children to parents Valeria Makokha and Cosmas Wafula. He was born in Busia, Kenya.  Bukeko attended Jogoo Road Primary School and proceeded to Upper Hill Secondary, a Middle school in Nairobi, where he got his Kenya Certificate of Secondary Education (KCSE).

Personal life
Bukeko was married to Beatrice Ebbie Andega and they had three children: Tony, Charlie and Wendy. Bukeko had diabetes.  He died in the Karen hospital in Nairobi, Kenya, on 18 July 2020, after contracting COVID-19 during the COVID-19 pandemic in Kenya. He was 58, dying eight days after his birthday.

Filmography
 The Constant Gardener (2005)
 Malooned! (2007)
 The Captain of Nakara (2012)

References

External links
 

Kenyan male film actors
Kenyan male television actors
21st-century Kenyan male actors
Kenyan male comedians
1962 births
2020 deaths
Deaths from the COVID-19 pandemic in Kenya